KZKV (103.1 FM) is an American radio station licensed to serve the community of Karnes City, Texas. The station is owned by the Educational Media Foundation (EMF) and is part of its K-Love national network, airing a contemporary Christian music format. The transmitter is located near Yorktown, Texas.

Prior to being exchanged to EMF in 2022, the station operated as a rimshot local station serving the eastern fringes of San Antonio area, though without a substantial signal in the market.

History
In August 2005, KTXX went on air as the 70th Air America Radio affiliate.

In 2009, KTXX became , playing Spanish favorites. On November 2, 2009, the station changed their call letters to KHHL. In 2010, the station changed formats once again to Spanish-language sports talk, branded as ESPN Deportes.

On May 6, 2019, KHHL began simulcasting sister station KLEY-FM and its Regional Mexican format.

This would ultimately be a placeholder format on KHHL, as just over two weeks later on March 4, owner Alpha Media announced a transfer deal with the Educational Media Foundation; EMF would assume the license of KHHL in exchange for EMF's license for translator K275CH in Portland, Oregon, which was owned by EMF but operated by Alpha. While no cash changed hands in the license swap, Alpha paid $111,000 to offset a portion of the rent remaining on KHHL’s lease. After the sale closed on April 25, 2022, the call sign was changed to KZKV on May 10, 2022, and the station was integrated into the K-Love network.

References

External links

ZKV
Radio stations established in 2005
2005 establishments in Texas
Educational Media Foundation radio stations
K-Love radio stations
ZKV
Contemporary Christian radio stations in the United States